This article contains two lists:
 The longest losing streaks in the regular season in NFL history
 The longest losing streaks in the postseason in NFL history

The Chicago Cardinals have the longest regular season losing streak, losing 29 consecutive games from 1942 through 1945. The Tampa Bay Buccaneers have the longest losing streak since the 1970 AFL–NFL merger, losing the first 26 games in franchise history in 1976 and 1977. The Detroit Lions hold the record for the longest postseason losing streak, dropping nine consecutive playoff games starting in 1991 – a streak which is still active.

Key

Streaks

Regular season

Playoffs

See also
 List of National Football League records (team)
 List of National Basketball Association longest losing streaks
 List of Major League Baseball longest losing streaks
 Losing streak

References

 Pro-Football-Reference.com list of longest regular season losing streaks
 Pro-Football-Reference.com list of longest postseason losing streaks

National Football League longest losing streaks
Lists of worsts